Charles Hampton may refer to:

Charles Gurney Hampton, fictional character
Charles Hampton (bishop) in Liberal Catholic Movement
Charles Hampton, character played by Charles Collette
Charles Hampton, Governor-General of Order of the Founders and Patriots of America

See also
Charles Hampton Indigo, fictional character
Hampton Charles (disambiguation)